Leroy Phillips (born 7 July 1964) is a South African former cricketer. He played in 22 first-class and 11 List A matches from 1984/85 to 1989/90.

References

External links
 

1964 births
Living people
South African cricketers
Border cricketers
Griqualand West cricketers
People from Queenstown, South Africa
Cricketers from the Eastern Cape